Carl Johan Merner (born March 16, 1975) is a Swedish film producer. To the audience he is known for the movies Gnomes and Trolls: The Secret Chamber and The Real Estate.

Filmography
 Gnomes and Trolls: The Secret Chamber - 2008
 The Real Estate - 2018
 Gnomes and Trolls: The Forest Trial - 2015

References

External links
 

Swedish film producers

1975 births

Living people